{{DISPLAYTITLE:C10H22O}}
The molecular formula C10H22O (molar mass: 158.28 g/mol, exact mass: 158.1671 u) may refer to:

 1-Decanol
 2-Propylheptanol (2PH)